Zephyr was a vessel built at Hull in 1796. She initially traded with the Baltic, though for a year or so she was a London-based transport. From 1810 she made 27 voyages as a whaler in the northern whale fishery. She returned to mercantile trade and was last listed in 1853.

Career
Zephyr first appeared in Lloyd's Register (LR) in the volume for 1796.

Zephyr was absent from the 1809 volume of Lloyd's Register. She reappeared in the 1810 volume with a new owner and new trade, that of a northern whaler.

The data below is from Coltish, augmented with press reports. On occasion, after the whaling season (April to September), Zephyr traded with the Baltic.

In 1815 Captain Unthank purchased Zephyr.

On 2 July 1830 the whaler  became trapped in ice at Davis Strait, leading her crew to abandon her and join other whaling vessels in the area. The crews of Zephyr and  worked for 48 hours to clear her of ice. They then set fire to the upper part of William, lightening her and causing her to rise. When she rose to the point that the beams above the casks of blubber she had collected were exposed, they set fire to them too. When the casks appeared, the crews put out the fire. When Williams master would not sign over her blubber and whale fins to the crews, Zephyr sailed away. Traveller took on 70 butts of blubber and one ton of whale fins. Captain Simpson took them back with him and sold them, keeping the proceeds for himself and his men. Williams owners sued for the proceeds, but Simpson argued that it was a long-standing custom of the whaling trade that salvaged cargo belonged to the men who had salvaged it. The jury found for the plaintiffs, who had estimated the value of the lost whale products at £500, and awarded them £392. Although all but one witness, all of whom were masters of whaling ships, testified for the defendant, the jury found for the plaintiff.

Zephyr was not listed in 1837, and the relevant page is missing from the volume for 1838. Zephyr reappeared in the volume for 1839. Lloyd's Register gave her owner as Stock & Co. John Unthank, Benjamin Stocks (merchant of Cottingham), and Thomas Shackles (oil merchant of Hull) were partners.

In 1845 her owners sold her to London owners and her homeport changed from Hull to London. A few years later the London owners sold Zephyr to owners that sailed her between Stockton and Canada.

Fate
Zephyr was last listed in the 1853 volume of Lloyd's Register, without a trade.

Notes

Citations

References

1796 ships
Age of Sail merchant ships of England
Maritime incidents in 1830
Whaling ships